Hong Kong 3D Museum is a privately owned art museum on Granville Road, Hong Kong. Specializing in trompe-l'œil, it opened on 7 July 2014. It features art created by local artists that focuses on local culture and views of the city, and provides instructions to help visitors view and photograph the optical illusions. It was inspired by the Trickeye Museum in Seoul and similar museums in other Asian countries.

In April 2015, it hosted the first 3D exhibition on the manga series One Piece, which was criticized as prone to continuity errors but otherwise well received. In May 2015, a subsidiary gallery of the museum was opened in Ponte 16, Macau.

References

External links
 Official website of Magical World
 Official website of Pier 16 Macau 3D World

Art museums and galleries in Hong Kong
Tsim Sha Tsui East
Tourist attractions in Hong Kong
2014 establishments in Hong Kong